Syllepte sarronalis is a moth in the family Crambidae. It was described by Francis Walker in 1859. It is found in Sierra Leone and the Gambia.

References

Moths described in 1859
sarronalis
Moths of Africa